The 1980 Roller Hockey World Cup was the twenty-fourth roller hockey world cup, organized by the Fédération Internationale de Roller Sports. It was contested by 16 national teams (6 from Europe, 4 from South America, 2 from North America, 2 from Asia and 2 from Oceania). All the games were played in the city of Talcahuano, in Chile, the chosen city to host the World Cup.

Group stage

Group A

Group B

Group C

Group D

Final phase

9th to 16th play-off

Final-eight

Standings

See also
FIRS Roller Hockey World Cup

External links
1980 World Cup in rink-hockey.net historical database

Roller Hockey World Cup
International roller hockey competitions hosted by Chile
1980 in roller hockey
1980 in Chilean sport